State Route 436 (SR 436) is a  north–south state highway in Carroll County, Tennessee. It serves as a connector between the town of McLemoresville and the city of McKenzie.

Route description

SR 436 begins just east of McLemoresville at an intersection with US 70A/SR 77. It winds its way north through farmland for several miles before passing through some wooded areas, where it crosses a bridge over the South Fork of the Obion River. The highway then winds its way northwest through farmland for several more miles before entering McKenzie along Cherrywood Avenue. SR 436 passes through some neighborhoods before coming to an end at an intersection with US 79/SR 76 just south of downtown. The entire route of SR 436 is a two-lane highway.

Major intersections

References

436
Transportation in Carroll County, Tennessee